Gedo Education Committee or GEC for short is an education service organization which is based in south west Somali region of Gedo.

History
GEC was created to unite the school systems in the seven districts of Gedo region. Gedo Region's seven school districts are Beled Hawo, Bardera, Buurdhuubo, Doolow, El Wak, Garbaharey and Luuq.

Background
For more than a decade, starting mid 1990s, disconnected schools appeared all across Gedo region. GEC chairman Ahmed Abdirahman Kaynan, thought of creating a center which caterers to all school districts in terms of unified curriculum and exam board center.

Mr. Kaynan has long experience in working with educational institutions and setting up school boards. Uniting schools from seven school boards in all seven districts of Gedo will create an estimated student body of 60,000 students from grade one to grade 12.

GEC Location
GEC is headquartered in Bardera, Gedo's largest city. All cities from Dolow to El Wak will have representatives sitting in the administration office.

GEC Teacher Training Services
One of the GEC's important activities will be offering annual teacher training opportunities in Gedo region as well as seminars designed to enhance teachers' qualities.

Teacher training services will increase the available pool teachers in Gedo where districts can draw more teacher for their school systems.

Exam Board
GEC's exam board is based in Bardera. Some of the task this office performs include preparing exams for all districts and grading final exams collected from grade and the last year of high school as the custom is in East Africa school systems.

Schools Needing Urgent Curriculum Cohesion
Currently, towns in Gedo which have the largest school populations are Bardera, Beled Hawo, Garbaharey, El Ade, Luuq, Buurdhuubo, and Doolow. Only Bardera, Garbaharey, Beled Hawo and El Ade have up to secondary schools. El Wak and Dolow have the least district level school developments.

High school students from Gedo region have an opportunity to be part of new in-takes from the University of Gedo and Bardera Polytechnic. Each year about 300 students will find tertiary study spots at these institutions and they are both based in Bardera.

Gedo
Educational organisations based in Somalia
Teacher training programs